The 1928 People's Cup (Gvia HaAm) was the first season of Israeli Football Association's nationwide football cup competition. Matches began on 7 April 1928 and the final was played on 26 May 1928.

Hapoel Allenby Tel Aviv won the cup, beating Maccabi Hasmonean Jerusalem 2–0 in the final. However, the Jerusalem club appealed to the F.A., claiming that a Hapoel player, Moshe Meir wasn't registered. The appeal was accepted and the teams were ordered to share the cup.

Background
Starting in 1922, unofficial cup competitions were held in Mandatory Palestine on an annual, national basis under the sponsorship of Britain's military garrison there, at start involving British teams only, but in subsequent years, Arab and Jewish teams as well. As these cups pre-date the existence of a national football association, they are not considered official by the Israel Football Association. 

During this time there was also a national cup organised by the Maccabi organisation, the Magen Shimshon, but this only included Maccabi clubs.

Results

First round
The matches were played on 7 April 1928 and 14 April 1928.

Quarter-finals
The matches were played on 21 April 1928  and 28 April 1928. The Replay between Hapoel Haifa and British Police was played on 5 May 1928.

Replays

Semi-finals

Final

References
100 Years of Football 1906-2006, Elisha Shohat (Israel), 2006

See also
 1927–28 in Mandatory Palestine football

External links
 Israel Football Association website 

Israel State Cup seasons
Palestine Cup
Cup